Pay Day is a 1918 American silent comedy-drama film. Written and directed by the husband and wife team of Sidney Drew and Lucile McVey (credited as Mrs. Sidney Drew), the film stars Sidney Drew, Lucile McVey, and Florence Short. It was released on May 27, 1918.

Cast list
 Sidney Drew as Kirke Brentwood
 Lucile McVey as Doris Fenton (credited as Mrs. Sidney Drew)
 Florence Short as Vampire
 Emily Lorraine as Mrs. Fenton
 Charles Riegel as Dr. Grayson
 Linda Farley as Isabel, Mrs. Brentwood I
 Dan Baker as Watkins
 Richard Rowland as himself (credited as Richard A. Rowland)
 Joseph W. Engel as himself (credited as Joseph Engel)
 Mrs. Samuel Zucker as Ruth, Mrs. Brentwood II

References

American silent feature films
American black-and-white films
1918 comedy-drama films
1918 films
1910s American films
Silent American comedy-drama films
1910s English-language films